Betul tehsil is a fourth-order administrative and revenue division, a subdivision of third-order administrative and revenue division of Betul district of Madhya Pradesh.

Geography
Betul tehsil has an area of 973.14 sq kilometers. It is bounded by Bhainsdehi tehsil in the southwest and west, Chicholi tehsil in the northwest, Ghodadongari tehsil in the north and northeast, Amla tehsil in the east, Multai tehsil in the southeast and Athner tehsil in the south.

See also 
Betul district

References

Tehsils of Madhya Pradesh
Betul district